Florida is a province in the Santa Cruz Department, Bolivia. Its capital is Samaipata. The province was created by law on December 15, 1924.

Division
The province is divided into four municipalities which are further subdivided into cantons.

Places of interest
 The archaeological site of Fort Samaipata (El Fuerte de Samaipata) which was declared a UNESCO World Heritage Site in 1998 and Amboró National Park are the principal tourist attractions of the province.
 Laguna Volcán
 Las Cuevas. There are several pools and beaches where the locals swim and disport themselves.

References 

Provinces of Santa Cruz Department (Bolivia)